The Massachusetts Korean War Memorial is installed in Charlestown, Boston's Charlestown Naval Shipyard Park, within the Boston Navy Yard, in the U.S. state of Massachusetts. The 1993 memorial was commissioned by the Massachusetts Korean War Veterans Committee. It features a bronze sculpture of a soldier on a granite base. The memorial was surveyed by the Smithsonian Institution's "Save Outdoor Sculpture!" program in 1997.

References

1993 establishments in Massachusetts
1993 sculptures
Bronze sculptures in Massachusetts
Charlestown, Boston
Granite sculptures in Massachusetts
Korean War memorials and cemeteries
Military monuments and memorials in the United States
Monuments and memorials in Boston
Outdoor sculptures in Boston
Sculptures of men in Massachusetts
Statues in Boston